Tôn Hiếu Anh is a Vietnamese fashion designer, and editor and producer of Fashion Studio on VTV6 (Television Program).

He was a model from 1994 to 2000, then moved into design, winning the 2nd prize of fashion contest 24/7 of the British Council in 2002, and 1st prize of Dep Fair 2005.

References

Living people
Year of birth missing (living people)
Vietnamese fashion designers
Vietnamese television presenters
Vietnamese producers
Vietnamese male models
Place of birth missing (living people)